Ola Mildred Rexroat (August 28, 1917 – June 28, 2017) was the only Native American woman to serve in the Women Airforce Service Pilots (WASP).

Rexroat was born in Argonia, Kansas, to a Euro-American father and an Oglala mother.  The family moved to South Dakota when she was young, and she spent at least part of her youth on the Pine Ridge Reservation.  She attended public school in Wynona, Oklahoma, for a time, and graduated from the St. Mary's Episcopal Indian School in Springfield, South Dakota, in 1932.  Rexroat initially enrolled in a teachers college in Chadron, Nebraska, but left before completing her degree to work for what is now the Bureau of Indian Affairs for a year.  She earned a bachelor's degree in art from the University of New Mexico in 1939.  After college, she again worked for the Bureau of Indian Affairs in Gallup, New Mexico for a year.

Rexroat next worked for engineers building airfields, where she decided to learn how to fly.  In order to do so, she would need her own airplane or to join the WASPs. Selecting the latter, she moved to Washington, D.C., with her mother and sisters, and was also employed at the Army War College.  Rexroat then went for WASP training in Sweetwater, Texas, and was assigned the dangerous job of towing targets for aerial gunnery students at Eagle Pass Army Airfield after her graduation.  She also helped transport cargo and personnel.  

When the WASPs were disbanded in December 1944, she joined the Air Force, where she served for ten years as an air traffic controller at Kirkland Air Force Base in New Mexico during the Korean War.  She continued to work as an air traffic controller for the Federal Aviation Administration for 33 years after her time in the Air Force Reserves was complete.

In 2007 she was inducted into the South Dakota Aviation Hall of Fame.

Rexroat died in June 2017 at the age of 99.  Immediately before her death she was the last surviving WASP in South Dakota and one of 275 living WASPs out of the original 1,074.  Several months after her death, the airfield operations building at Ellsworth Air Force Base was named after her.

References

1917 births
2017 deaths
Aviators from Kansas
Aviators from South Dakota
Oglala people
People from the Pine Ridge Indian Reservation, South Dakota
People from Riley County, Kansas
Women Airforce Service Pilots personnel
University of New Mexico alumni
Native American women aviators
20th-century Native American women
20th-century Native Americans
21st-century Native American women
21st-century Native Americans